The Black Aces are a group of black pitchers who have won at least 20 Major League Baseball games in a single season. The term comes from the title of a book written by former Major League Baseball (MLB) pitcher Mudcat Grant, one of the members of the group.

In the first years after the desegregation of MLB, teams who drafted African American pitchers often converted them into position players; few were allowed to continue pitching. Grant is the first African American 20-game winner in American League history. Two members of the Black Aces, Bob Gibson and Ferguson Jenkins, are members of the National Baseball Hall of Fame. The group has organized formally to promote their successes and encourage the development of future black players.

Some black pitchers from Latin America, notably Luis Tiant (a 20-win pitcher four times in his career), have expressed disappointment that they are not included in this group. Meanwhile, Ferguson Jenkins is a Black Canadian, although he can trace his ancestry on his mother's side to escaped U.S. slaves.

The Negro Leagues Baseball Museum had a traveling exhibit honoring the Black Aces. The Black Aces were celebrated at McAfee Coliseum in 2007.

Pitchers described by Grant as Black Aces

Other African-American pitchers to win 20 games

References

Baseball pitching
Lists of African-American people